Schuylkill Haven is a borough in Schuylkill County, Pennsylvania, United States. The borough's population was 5,253 as of the 2020 census. Schuylkill Haven is situated along the Schuylkill River, for which it is named.  Schuylkill Haven is a focal point of activity in southern Schuylkill County.

Early settlements
Before Europeans settled the land that is now part of Schuylkill Haven, the area was occupied by the Lenape Indian tribe, who were known as the Delaware Indians by the British.

The earliest white settlers first arrived in the area in the 1730s, traveled north of the Blue Mountain at the modern Berks-Schuylkill County line at that time. The first settler in Schuylkill Haven was John Fincher, a Quaker from Chester County, Pennsylvania. Fincher constructed a house and barn near the Schuylkill River, and called his small settlement "Fincher's Ford."

The next known settler of Schuylkill Haven was Martin Dreibelbis, a German who arrived in the Spring of 1775. Martin Dreibelbis constructed a house, saw mill, distillery, and a grist mill on the eastern bank of the Schuylkill River.  He later built a log house near modern-day Main Street, giving Martin Dreibelbis the title of the first citizen of Schuylkill Haven.  Martin Dreibelbis willed the original plot of the town to a son, Jacob.  Another son, Daniel, received an area east of the original plot, and a third son, George, received an area outside of the present borough known as "Seven Stars" (located north of Schuylkill Haven on the Schuylkill River).  The original plot of Schuylkill Haven shows that the borough stretched from the Schuylkill River on the west, to present-day Main Street on the north (then known as Front Street), to Saint Peter Street on the east (then known as Jacob Street), and Liberty Street on the south.  Present-day Columbia Street was the main residential district.

Geography and climate

The hardiness zone is 6b. The borough has a hot-summer humid continental climate (Dfa) and average monthly temperatures range from 28.1 °F in January to 73.1 °F in July.

Borough services and facilities
Schuylkill Haven provides electric, water, sewer, and refuse services to the citizens of the borough. The borough purchases electricity from AMP Ohio and Allegheny. The Tumbling Run Reservoir, located about five miles (8 km) north of the borough, is the Schuylkill Haven's primary source of water.  Storage tanks at Willow Lake at the northern edge of the borough are an additional part of the borough's water facilities.  Schuylkill Haven owns a second watershed located in Wayne Township with a small portion extending into Branch Township known as the Panther valley dam. This water supply is no longer used but the earthen dam still exists today. Schuylkill Haven's sewage treatment plant is located at the southern edge of town, on the western side of St. Charles Street.

Schuylkill Haven's borough hall was once located in the Schuylkill Haven train station on Main Street. But in July 2015, it was moved to 333 Centre Avenue (Pennsylvania Route 61).

Schuylkill Haven is served by its own police force.  The Schuylkill Haven Police Department consists of eight officers.  The Police Department provides service 24 hours a day, 7 days a week, with at least two officers typically on duty at any given time.  The police station on Parkway is also home to the council chambers.

Schuylkill Haven has a volunteer fire department.  The borough has three fire stations:  The Rainbow Hose Co. (Station 1) located on Dock Street, the Schuylkill Hose Co. (Station 2) located at Union & St. Peter Streets, and the Liberty Fire Co. (Station 4) located at Columbia & St. James Streets.

Parks and recreation
Schuylkill Haven has numerous playgrounds and recreation areas.

Playgrounds in the borough include the "Green Goose" (located on Jackson street just west of Avenue A), the Saylor Street playground (in the western side of the borough), the Naffin Avenue playground (located on Naffin Avenue just northwest of the public school district's main athletic field), and the Willow Street playground (located in the northwestern corner of the borough).  Other children's play areas are located on Garfield Avenue, North Berne Street, Williams Street, and Fritz Reed Avenue.  Located on South Berne Street is an area known as "The Courts" which features a basketball court, picnic benches, and a gazebo.

Bubeck Park is located south of Columbia street near the Columbia Heights section of the borough.  The park includes two pavilions, a bandstand, and a gazebo.  Situated at the eastern edge of Bubeck Park is Stoyer's Dam.  Officially dedicated on May 20, 1984, this man-made dam is the site of fishing and iceskating, as well as the home of numerous ducks, geese, and swans.  The source of water for the dam is Long Run Creek, which enters on the western side of the dam after traveling along Pennsylvania Route 443 from the Friedensburg, Pennsylvania area.

Island Park is the newest addition to Schuylkill Haven's park system.  It is located south of Fritz Reed Avenue between the Schuylkill River to the north, east, and south, and the Reading Blue Mountain and Northern Railroad tracks to the west.  Island park is currently the site of fireworks displays in the borough. In addition, the park includes 2 baseball fields, several soccer fields, and a large pavilion. This is the starting point of "The Schuylkill County Sojurn", a kayaking trip down the Schuylkill River from Schuylkill Haven to Philadelphia.

The Community Center, also known as the Recreation Center or the Senior Center, is located at 340 Haven Street. Senior citizen events, biddy basketball, and internet access are found at the center.  A gym and two rooms are available to rent for meetings, showers, and small parties.  The center is handicap accessible and has handicap accessible bathrooms.

The Walk In Art Center is a main attraction in Schuylkill Haven, featuring 15 on site artists and three art galleries and many educational programs and community events.

Religion
Schuylkill Haven has one Catholic church, ten Protestant churches and one Mandir, Vraj Hindu Temple within its city limits.  The churches include (in alphabetical order):

 Bible Tabernacle Pentecostal Church, 35 South Margaretta Street
 Calvary United Pentecostal Church, 21 Dock Street
 Church of the Nazarene, 220 West Main Street
 Covenant United Methodist Church, 215 East Main Street
 First United Church of Christ, 110 Route 61 South (Center Avenue)
 First United Methodist Church, 420 Saylor Street
 Grace Evangelical Congregational Church, 15 Earl Stoyer Drive
 Jerusalem Evangelical Lutheran Church, 252 Dock Street
 St. Ambrose Roman Catholic Church, 201 Randel Street
 St. James Episcopal Church, 100 Dock Street
 St. John's United Church of Christ, 121 East Main Street

Demographics

As of the 2010 census, There were 5,437 people, 2,330 Households and 1,417 families residing in the borough. The Population density was. The racial makeup of the borough was 94.5% White, 2.1% Hispanic or Latino ancestry of any race, 2.5% Black or African American, 0.9% Asian, 1.3% were two or more races, 0.4% were some other race and 0.2% Native American.

As of the 2000 census,  there were 5,548 people, 2,393 households, and 1,536 families residing in the borough. The population density was 3,908.2 people per square mile (1,508.5/km2). There were 2,551 housing units at an average density of 1,797.0 per square mile (693.6/km2). The racial makeup of the borough was 97.22% White, 0.76% African American, 0.14% Native American, 0.70% Asian, 0.05% Pacific Islander, 0.29% from other races, and 0.83% from two or more races. Hispanic or Latino of any race were 1.26% of the population.

There were 2,393 households, out of which 28.0% had children under the age of 18 living with them, 48.7% were married couples living together, 11.5% had a female householder with no husband present, and 35.8% were non-families. 31.8% of all households were made up of individuals, and 16.3% had someone living alone who was 65 years of age or older. The average household size was 2.31 and the average family size was 2.89.

The population was spread out with 23.1% under the age of 18, 7.0% from 18 to 24, 29.4% from 25 to 44, 21.7% from 45 to 64, and 18.9% who were 65 years of age or older. The median age was 39 years. For every 100 females, there were 91.1 males. For every 100 females age 18 and over, there were 86.8 males.

The median income for a household in the borough was $32,442, and the median income for a family was $41,286. Males had a median income of $33,047 versus $20,582 for females. The per capita income for the borough was $16,804. About 7.1% of families and 8.5% of the population were below the poverty line, including 7.4% of those under age 18 and 15.3% of those age 65 or over.

Government and politics
Schuylkill Haven is governed by a borough council and a mayor.  There are seven borough council members, each elected to a four-year term.  The mayor is also elected to a four-year term, with the next mayoral election in November, 2021.  The current mayor is Mike Devlin (D).  There are no term limits for borough council members or the mayor.  Borough council meetings are typically held on the first and third Wednesdays of each month in council chambers located in the borough's police station at 250 Parkway.  In addition to council and the mayor, a borough administrator leads the municipality's daily operations. That office is located at 333 Center Avenue (Route 61).

Schuylkill Haven is in the 9th United States Congressional District. Its current US Congressman is Dan Meuser (R).

Schuylkill Haven is in the 29th Pennsylvania Senate District. Its current state Senator is Dave Argall (R).

Schuylkill Haven is in the 125th Pennsylvania House of Representatives District. Its current state Representative is Joseph Kerwin (R).

Education

Primary and secondary education
The borough of Schuylkill Haven lies within Schuylkill Haven Area School District. Students in grades eight through twelve attend Schuylkill Haven High School. The district also maintains a middle school and an elementary school.

Colleges and universities
Penn State Schuylkill is part of the Pennsylvania State University system and is located along Pennsylvania Route 61 immediately northeast of the borough. This public college currently offers five associate degrees, along with the opportunity to complete the first two years of 160 majors from Penn State.

Public library
Also within the borough is the Schuylkill Haven Free Public Library. Dedicated on June 26, 1966, the library is located at 104 St. John Street at the intersection of St. John Street and Union Street. The library is open Monday through Saturday.

Transportation

Schuylkill Haven is served by two state highways, Pennsylvania Route 61 and Pennsylvania Route 443.  PA Route 61 (a north–south highway) travels through the northern part of the borough.  PA Route 61 is known as "Center Avenue" in Schuylkill Haven.  The road continues north to Pottsville, Pennsylvania and ends in Sunbury, Pennsylvania, and south into Berks County, Pennsylvania where it ends in the city of Reading, Pennsylvania.  PA Route 443 enters Schuylkill Haven at the western end of the borough where it is known as "Columbia Street."  It continues on "Parkway" to "Main Street" until it enters "Dock Street."  PA Route 443 exits the town along with PA Route 61 on the northeastern side of the borough.  PA Route 443 continues east toward Orwigsburg, Pennsylvania, and west toward Pine Grove, Schuylkill County, Pennsylvania.

Schuylkill Haven is not directly served by any interstate highways.  Interstate 81 can be accessed from PA Route 443 near Pine Grove, Schuylkill County, Pennsylvania, whereas Interstate 78 can be accessed near Hamburg, Pennsylvania in Berks County, Pennsylvania from PA Route 61. Route 61 through this area has recently undergone a $65 million widening project, greatly increasing the transportation complicity of the area.

The Reading Blue Mountain & Northern Railroad traverses the center of the borough on a single-track line with grade crossings on Williams Street, Union Street, and Main Street. Passenger train service between Schuylkill Haven, Reading and Philadelphia was operated by Conrail under the auspices of SEPTA until July 1, 1981 when PennDOT withdrew financial support. The RDG station was formerly used as Schuylkill Haven's borough hall and police station. The Schuylkill Haven station is now owned and operated by Reading Blue Mountain and Northern Railroad.

Schuylkill Canal
The Schuylkill Canal, created by The Schuylkill Navigation Company, was incorporated into Schuylkill Havens transportation in 1825. The canal was built onto the Schuylkill River as a means to transport coal and traveled from Philadelphia to Port Carbon. The use of this canal turned Reading, Norristown and Pottsville into manufacturing centers. 
In 1841, the Philadelphia and Reading Railroad began and by 1845 was transporting nearly three times as much coal than the Schuylkill Canal. The Schuylkill Navigation Company decided to expand their canals to accommodate for larger boats, however in 1869 the canals were damaged due to flooding and began to decline. The Railroads became the number one transportation for coal and the canals eventually were filled by the Commonwealth of Pennsylvania by 1979.

Notable people
Allen Moyer, Broadway set designer
Ralph Peters, non-fiction author
Elsie Singmaster, former children's and young adult author
Mike Tobash, former Pennsylvania State Senator

References

External links

 Official borough website
 Schuylkill Haven history website
 Fire District 63, Schuylkill Haven Fire Department

1750 establishments in Pennsylvania
Boroughs in Schuylkill County, Pennsylvania
Populated places established in 1750
Populated places on the Schuylkill River